Tauthali is a village in Sindhupalchok District in Bagmati Province, central Nepal. Tauthali is 110 km away from Kathmandu.

 census, the population was 2,762 (1,507 females and 1,255 males) in 776 households.

In the devastating earthquake of 2015, almost every house was destroyed including religious sites such as the temple of Tripura Sundari Mai. Within three years of the disaster, almost all houses had been rebuilt, completely transforming the village compared to before the earthquake.

Notable attractions

 The Tripura Sundari Mai temple
 Bhimeshwor temple
 Dahi Jatra, a jatra (street festival) celebrated by people splashing yoghurt on each other, in reverence to the Hindu goddess, Tripura Sundari

Gallery

References 

Populated places in Sindhupalchowk District